Nanupur Union is a union of Fatikchhari Upazila of Chittagong District.

History
Poet Shabrid Kha (Bangla-সাবরিদ খাঁ) had given the name Nanupur to respect his grandfather Nanuraza Khan Mollik.

Geography

Area of Nanupur: 2,031 acres (8.69 km2).

Location
 North: Lakshmichhari Upazila
 East:  Raozan Upazila
 South: Dharmapur Union
 West:  Lelang Union

Population

As of 1991 Bangladesh census, Nanupur union has a population of 5,846 and house units 449.

Economy

Nanupur Bazar is the main market place in the Nanupur Union. Its situated in central of Nanupur Village. Its previous name Kali Munshir Hat. Khiram is known as commercial village in union.

Education
 Nanupur Aboo Sobhan High School
 Nanupur Laila kabir degree college
 Khiram Azizia Sultanul Ulum Madrasha
 Nanupur Girls high school
 Khiram High School
 Nanupur Aboo Sobhan Govt. primary school
 Nanupur gausia senior fazil madrasha
 Nanupur obaidia madrasha
 Nanupur mohila alim madrasha
 Dhalkata primary school
 Nanupur Gawsia Primary School
 Mannania Primary School
 Gamritala Primary School
 Kipait Nagor Primary School

References
 https://web.archive.org/web/20110727203859/http://www.lcgbangladesh.org/derweb/Population_Union.xls
 ICAB Geographical List of Members Abroad

Unions of Fatikchhari Upazila